Rurik Rostislavich (Russian and Ukrainian: Рюрик Ростиславич) (died 1215), Prince of Novgorod (1170–1171), Belgorod Kievsky (currently Bilohorodka; 1173–1194), Grand Prince of Kiev (Kyiv, 1173, 1180–1181, 1194–1201, 1203–1204, 1205-1206, 1207–1210), Prince of Chernigov (1210–1214).

Life 
Rurik was the son of Rostislav I of Kiev, and succession conflicts placed Rurik on the throne of the Kievan Rus' no less than seven times. In 1182, he became co-ruler with Sviatoslav III of Kiev, an arrangement that lasted until Sviatoslav's death in 1194. Rurik ruled alone until 1199, when his rule was challenged by Roman the Great, who deposed Rurik.

After a brief stint in Chernihiv, where he built the Church of St. Paraskebas, Rurik, along with his kinsmen and a Cuman army, attacked and sacked Kiev in 1203, but was repelled until Roman's death in 1205. Rurik had been confined to a monastery in 1204, but he abandoned his holy vows and returned to the throne.

His cousin, Vsevolod, felt that Rurik's previous monastic vows rendered his authority invalid, and so attacked and briefly seized Kiev in 1206, 1207, and 1211. He succeeded in capturing Rurik, who died in captivity in Chernigov.

Rurik was married to Anna of Turov; among their children was Rostislav II of Kiev.

References

Sources 

Martin, Janet L.B. Medieval Russia, 980-1584, 1995 (Cambridge Medieval Textbooks)
 

1215 deaths
Grand Princes of Kiev
Rurik dynasty
Eastern Orthodox monarchs
Year of birth unknown
Rostislavichi family (Smolensk)